Ilypnus is a genus of gobies native to the eastern Pacific Ocean coasts of California, United States to Baja California, Mexico.

Species
There are currently two recognized species in this genus:
 Ilypnus gilberti (C. H. Eigenmann & R. S. Eigenmann, 1889) (Cheekspot goby)
 Ilypnus luculentus (Ginsburg, 1938) (Bright goby)

References

Gobionellinae
Taxa named by David Starr Jordan